is a former Japanese football player. He played for Japan national team.

Club career
Yamaguchi was born in Oita Prefecture on August 1, 1959. After graduating from high school, he joined Mitsubishi Motors in 1978. However he did not play in the game, as he was the team's reserve goalkeeper behind Japan national team player Mitsuhisa Taguchi. He retired in 1984. Eventually he could not play in the game.

National team career
In August 1979, Yamaguchi was selected Japan U-20 national team for 1979 World Youth Championship. However, he did not compete, as he was the team's reserve goalkeeper behind Yasuhito Suzuki. In February 1981, although he did not play at his club, he was selected Japan national team because Japan's manager Saburo Kawabuchi actively appointed young players. On February 19, Yamaguchi debuted for Japan national team against Singapore.

Club statistics

National team statistics

References

External links
 
 
 Japan National Football Team Database

1959 births
Living people
Association football people from Ōita Prefecture
Japanese footballers
Japan international footballers
Japan Soccer League players
Urawa Red Diamonds players
Association football goalkeepers